Innisrush or Inishrush is a small village and townland near Glenone in County Londonderry, Northern Ireland. In the 2001 Census it had a population of 114 people. It is situated within Mid-Ulster District.

Locally significant sites include St. Nossonus' Church of Ireland church, a listed building which stands on a hill to the east of the village. On Ford Road the old flax mill, mill race and weir on the Clady River are evidence of Innisrush's industrial past.

References 

Draft Magherafelt Area Plan 2015

External links
NI Neighbourhood Information System

Villages in County Londonderry
Mid-Ulster District